Loft is a 2010 Dutch crime film directed by Antoinette Beumer. It is a remake of the 2008 Belgian film Loft.

Cast 
 Fedja van Huêt - Bart Fenneker
 Barry Atsma - Matthias Stevens
 Jeroen van Koningsbrugge - Willem van Eijk
 Gijs Naber - Robert Hartman
 Marwan Kenzari - Tom Fenneker
 Anna Drijver - Ann Marai
 Sallie Harmsen - Sarah Lunter
 Kim van Kooten - Nathalie Stevens
 Lies Visschedijk - Annette van Eijk
 Hadewych Minis - Eva Fenneker
 Katja Herbers - Marjolein Hartman
  - Kimmy Fenneker-de Nijs
  - Linda Fenneker
 Renée Fokker - Vrouwelijke ondervrager

References

External links 

2010 crime drama films
2010 films
Dutch crime drama films
Remakes of Dutch films
2010s Dutch-language films